Wörschweiler Abbey (also Werschweiler in older literature) is a former Cistercian abbey in the commune of Homburg in Saarland state, Germany. The monastery site is about 30 kilometres east of Saarbrücken, on a mountain called Marienberg.

In 1131, Earl Friedrich of Saarwerden and his wife Gertrud founded Wörschweiler Abbey. In 1171, Wörscheiler Abbey became a daughter house of Villers-Bettnach Abbey.

Painting from 1810

References

External links 
Wörschweiler Abbey website

Cistercian monasteries in Germany
Monasteries in Saarland